Jochen Schöps (born 8 October 1983) is a German professional volleyball player, a former member of the Germany national team, a participant at the Olympic Games (Beijing 2008, London 2012), bronze medallist at the 2014 World Championship, and the 2006–07 CEV Champions League winner.

Personal life
In March 2016, Schöps became a father to twins, daughter Lotte and son Theo.

Career

Clubs
He won the 2006–07 CEV Champions League with VfB Friedrichshafen, and was named the Most Valuable Player. With the Russian team of Iskra Odintsovo he reached the 2008–09 CEV Champions League semifinals and was named the Best Scorer of the tournament. In the 2013–14 PlusLiga season, he won the Polish Championship silver medal after losing the final games to PGE Skra Bełchatów. On 29 March 2015, Asseco Resovia, including Schöps, won the 2014–15 CEV Champions League silver medal. In April 2016, he signed a new two–year contract until 2017.

Honours

Clubs
 CEV Champions League
  2006/2007 – with VfB Friedrichshafen
  2014/2015 – with Asseco Resovia

 CEV Cup
  2009/2010 – with Iskra Odintsovo

 National championships
 2004/2005  German Cup, with VfB Friedrichshafen
 2004/2005  German Championship, with VfB Friedrichshafen
 2005/2006  German Cup, with VfB Friedrichshafen
 2005/2006  German Championship, with VfB Friedrichshafen
 2006/2007  German Cup, with VfB Friedrichshafen
 2006/2007  German Championship, with VfB Friedrichshafen
 2012/2013  Polish Championship, with Asseco Resovia
 2013/2014  Polish SuperCup, with Asseco Resovia
 2014/2015  Polish Championship, with Asseco Resovia

Individual awards
 2002: CEV U20 European Championship – Best Spiker
 2007: CEV Champions League – Most Valuable Player
 2009: CEV Champions League – Best Scorer
 2009: European League – Best Spiker
 2009: European League – Most Valuable Player
 2010: CEV Cup – Best Spiker
 2010: CEV Cup – Best Scorer
 2015: Polish Cup – Best Opposite

References

External links

 
 
 
 Player profile at PlusLiga.pl 
 Player profile at Volleybox.net

1983 births
Living people
People from Villingen-Schwenningen
Sportspeople from Freiburg (region)
German men's volleyball players
Olympic volleyball players of Germany
Volleyball players at the 2008 Summer Olympics
Volleyball players at the 2012 Summer Olympics
Volleyball players at the 2015 European Games
European Games medalists in volleyball
European Games gold medalists for Germany
German expatriate sportspeople in Russia
Expatriate volleyball players in Russia
German expatriate sportspeople in Poland
Expatriate volleyball players in Poland
German expatriate sportspeople in France
Expatriate volleyball players in France
German expatriate sportspeople in Qatar
Expatriate volleyball players in Qatar
Resovia (volleyball) players
Opposite hitters